Kill Me, Heal Me is a 2015 South Korean television series starring Ji Sung, Hwang Jung-eum, Park Seo-joon, Oh Min-suk, and Kim Yoo-ri. It aired on MBC from January 7 to March 12, 2015 on Wednesdays and Thursdays at 21:55 for 20 episodes. The series incorporates dissociative identity disorder and child abuse elements as pivotal topics. It reunited Ji Sung and Hwang Jung-eum, who previously starred together in Secret Love (2013).

Synopsis

The human body is capable of all sorts of things to survive difficult situations. Cha Do Hyun (Ji Sung) is a third-generation business heir who developed dissociative identity disorder (previously known as multiple personality disorder) in the aftermath of several life-threatening traumatic events. He tries to regain control over his life with the help of Oh Ri Jin (Hwang Jung-eum), a beautiful first-year psychiatric resident who helps him secretly. But Ri Jin's twin brother, Oh Ri On (Park Seo-joon), is a writer who is determined to uncover the unscrupulous lives of the rich and starts following Do Hyun around. Can Do Hyun take control over his condition before one of his seven identities takes control of him instead?

Cast

Main
 Ji Sung as Cha Do-hyun (Cha Joon-young)
 Lee Do-hyun as child Cha Do-hyun (Cha Joon-young)
 A wealthy businessman with a warmhearted personality who loves to help others. He is the main personality of the body. However, after realizing that he suffers from dissociative identity disorder 11 years ago, he has been desperately trying to hide this fact from his families and friends. In Episode 17, it was revealed that Cha Joon-young is his real name. He has six other identities:

Shin Se-gi: A vehement young man with a devil-may-care demeanor who appears when Cha Do-hyun experiences violence. He may be violent, but he never hurts children and women. Se-gi endures all of Do-hyun's pain as he is the only identity to have all of Do-hyun's memories. His first love is Oh Ri-jin.

Perry Park: A 40-year-old man with an affinity for fishing and building bombs. He appears when Cha Do-hyun reminisces the sweetside of his father before they came back into the mansion. The name "Perry Park" came from the promise Do-hyun (Joon-young) made to his father, which is to buy a boat named Perry Park Boat for him. He speaks with a Jeolla dialect.

Ahn Yo-seob : A suicidal, intelligent 17-year-old boy who is an artist. He first appeared when Cha Do-hyun attempted to commit suicide when he was in high school. He is Yo-na's twin brother.

Ahn Yo-na : An extrovert and mischievous 17-year-old girl who loves idols. She appears when Cha Do-hyun undergoes a great deal of pain or mental stress, and needs to endure it clandestinely. She has a crush on Oh Ri-on. She is Yo-seob's twin sister.

Na-na (Cha Do-hyun): A 7-year-old girl who owns a teddy bear named Nana and revealed that her name is Cha Do-hyun. She is the embodiment of Do-hyun's childhood fears as well as Ri-jin's younger self.

Mr. X: A mysterious man who is later revealed as the father of Na-na.
 Hwang Jung-eum as Oh Ri-jin (Cha Do-hyun)
 Kim Amy as child Oh Ri-jin (Cha Do-hyun)
Oh Ri-on's twin sister. A first-year psychiatry resident who tries hard to maintain her seemingly perfect image to cover for her real personality. At first glance, she looks beautiful, elegant and gentle, but she is actually messy and short-tempered. Ri-jin then becomes Do-hyun's secret psychiatrist, and slowly falls in love with him. In Episode 16, it was revealed that Cha Do-hyun is her real name.
 Park Seo-joon as Oh Ri-on (Omega / Oh Hwi)
 Kim Ye-jun as child Oh Ri-on
Oh Ri-jin's twin older brother. Ri-on often gets mistaken for a goofy simpleton, but he is actually a famous mystery novelist under the pseudonym Omega who investigates about the Seungjin Family. His other name is Oh Hwi which he uses to flirt with girls.
 Oh Min-suk as Cha Ki-joon
President of ID Entertainment, he is Do-hyun's confident and competent cousin. Ki-joon and Do-hyun are rivals, with both competing to inherit their family's company.
 Kim Yoo-ri as Han Chae-yeon
She is Do-hyun's first love and Ki-joon's fiancée, a cold and prideful woman.

Supporting
 Choi Won-young as Ahn Gook, Do-hyun's Secretary.
 Ko Chang-seok as Suk Ho-pil (Dr. Schofield), Do-hyun's physician and Ri-jin's professor.

Seungjin Family
 Kim Young-ae as Seo Tae-im, Chairwoman of Seungjin Group and Do-hyun's grandmother
 Shim Hye-jin as Shin Hwa-ran, Do-hyun's birth mother
 Ahn Nae-sang as Cha Joon-pyo, Do-hyun's father
 Kim Il-woo as Cha Young-pyo, President of Seungjin Group and Ki-joon's father
 Kim Na-woon as Yoon Ja-kyung, Ki-joon's mother
 Myung Se-bin as Min Seo-yeon, Do-hyun's registered mother
 Kim Yong-gun as Cha Gun-ho, First Chairman of Seungjin Group

Family of Ri-jin and Ri-on
 Kim Hee-jung as Ji Soon-young, Ri-jin and Ri-on's mother
 Park Jun-gyu as Oh Dae-oh, Ri-jin and Ri-on's father

Others
 Kim Hyung-bum as Section Chief Choi
 Go On as Alex Kang
 Kim Hyun-joo  as Baek Jin-sook, Chae-yeon's mother
 Lee Si-eon as Chief Park Min-jae
 Kang Bong-sung as Doctor Shin Sun-jo
 Jo Chang-geun as Doctor Kang In-gyu
 Choi Hyo-eun as Nurse Joo Mi-ro
 Heo Ji-woong as Omegas editor

Special appearances
 Yoon Joo as Jennifer
 Jung Eun-pyo as U.S. psychiatrist who was afraid of Do-hyun (Episode 1)
 Kan Mi-youn as Shin Se-gi's girlfriend in the U.S. (Episode 1)
 Woo Hyun as Alcohol-dependent, mental patient (Episode 1)
 Koo Jun-yup as Club Paradise DJ (Episode 1)
 Kim Seul-gi as Patient Heo Sook-hee (Episode 1–4)
 Jo Yoon-ho as The biker with leather jacket (Episode 1–3)
 Seo Yi-ahn as Hong Ji-sun, Do-hyun's arranged date (Episode 7)
 LU:KUS as Idol group Rocking (Episode 8)
 Park Seul-gi as The MC (Episode 8)
 J.One (LU:KUS) as J.I. (Rocking) (Episode 11–12)
 Ahn Young-mi as Tarot card reader (Episode 13)
 Kwon Yu-ri as Ahn Yo-na (Episode 20)

Casting
 Supposedly  Lee Seung Gi was supposed to play the role of Cha Do-hyun, but declined. It was next offered Hyun Bin, but he also declined.
 Lim Ji-yeon was as well offered to become the female lead of the series but declined.

Original soundtrack

Part 1

Part 2

Part 3

Part 4

Part 5

Part 6

Chart performance

Ratings
 In this table,  represent the lowest ratings and  represent the highest ratings.
 NR''' denotes that the drama did not rank in the top 20 daily programs on that date.

Awards and nominations

Remake
A Chinese remake, A Seven-Faced Man'' aired on Tencent in 2017.

A Hong Kong remake, Threesome aired on TVB in 2018.

References

External links
  
 Kill Me, Heal Me at MBC Global Media
 
 

2015 South Korean television series debuts
2015 South Korean television series endings
MBC TV television dramas
Korean-language television shows
South Korean medical television series
South Korean suspense television series
South Korean television series remade in other languages
Dissociative identity disorder in television
Television series by Pan Entertainment
Television series by Huace Media